Montpellier Hérault Sport Club, commonly referred to as Montpellier HSC or simply Montpellier, is a French professional football club based in the city of Montpellier in Occitanie. The original club was founded in 1919, while the current incarnation was founded through a merger in 1974. Montpellier currently plays in Ligue 1, the top level of French football and plays its home matches at the Stade de la Mosson, located within the city. The first team is managed by Michel Der Zakarian and captained by Teji Savanier.

Montpellier is owned by Laurent Nicollin, the son of the late Louis Nicollin, a French entrepreneur, who had been owner since 1974. The club have produced several famous players in its history, most notably Laurent Blanc, who has served as manager of the France national team. Blanc is also the club's all-time leading goalscorer. Eric Cantona, Roger Milla, Carlos Valderrama and Olivier Giroud are other players who have played in Montpellier's colours. In 2001, Montpellier introduced a women's team.

History 
Montpellier was founded under the name Stade Olympique Montpelliérain (SOM) and played under the name for most of its existence. In 1989, after playing under various names, the club changed its name to its current form. Montpellier is one of the founding members of the first division of French football. Along with Marseille, Rennes and Nice, Montpellier is one of only a few clubs to have played in the inaugural 1932–33 season and is still playing in the first division. The club won Ligue 1 for the first time in the 2011–12 season. Montpellier's other honours to date include winning the Coupe de France in 1929 and 1990, and the UEFA Intertoto Cup in 1999.

In the 2011–12 season, Montpellier won its first Ligue 1 title, finishing the season with 82 points, three points ahead of runners-up Paris Saint-Germain. On 20 May 2012, in a game marred by stoppages for crowd violence, John Utaka scored a brace to secure a 2–1 victory over Auxerre and win the Ligue 1 title for Montpellier. Olivier Giroud, who finished the season with 21 goals and 9 assists, was the league's top goal scorer. Despite being tied on goals with Paris Saint-Germain attacker Nenê, he was named the league's top scorer by the Ligue de Football Professionnel due to finishing with more goals in open play.

Players

Current squad

Out on loan

Records

Most appearances

Top scorers

Management and staff

Club officials 

Senior club staff
President: Laurent Nicollin
Association chairman: Gilbert Varlot
Sporting Director: Bruno Carotti
Head of Youth: Francis De Taddeo

Coaching and medical staff
Manager: Michel Der Zakarian
Assistant manager: Ghislain Printant
First-Team coach: Franck Rizzetto
Goalkeeper coach: Dominique Deplagne
Goalkeeper coach: Teddy Richert
Fitness coach: Stéphane Paganelli
Scout: Serge Delmas

Coaching history

Honours

Domestic 
Ligue 1
Champions (1): 2011–12
Ligue 2
Champions (3): 1945–46, 1960–61, 1986–87
Coupe de France
Champions (2): 1928—29, 1989–90
Runners-up (2): 1930—31, 1993–94
Coupe de la Ligue
Champions (1): 1992
Runners-up (2): 1994, 2010–11
Division d'Honneur (Languedoc-Roussillon)
Champions (2): 1981, 1992

Europe 
UEFA Intertoto Cup
Winners (1): 1999

Other 
Division d'Honneur (Sud-Est)
Champions (3): 1928, 1932, 1976

U19 
Coupe Gambardella
Champions (3): 1996, 2009, 2017
Runners-up (3): 1984, 1985, 1997

References

External links 

 

 
Association football clubs established in 1919
Sport in Montpellier
1919 establishments in France
UEFA Intertoto Cup winning clubs
Football clubs in Occitania (administrative region)
Ligue 1 clubs